HMS E40 was a British E class submarine launched by Palmer, Jarrow in 1916 and was completed by Armstrong Whitworth, Newcastle upon Tyne. She was launched on 9 November 1916 and was commissioned in May 1917.

During her World War I service while patrolling Scandinavian waters E40 encountered a U-boat. As the submarine dived the captain was hit with shrapnel and had to be dragged in; the hatch stuck and the vessel took on water, going straight to the bottom. After an hour the air was poor; with the captain unconscious, the first lieutenant asked the crew if he could use the remaining oxygen to try to raise the submarine. This succeeded and the E40 managed to get back to Middlesbrough where it had been posted missing, presumed sunk. The captain survived. HMS E40 was sold on 14 December 1921.

Design
She was powered by two  Vickers eight-cylinder two-stroke diesel engines and two  electric motors.

E40 was armed with a 12-pounder  QF gun mounted forward of the conning tower. She had five 18 inch (450 mm) torpedo tubes, two in the bow, one either side amidships, and one in the stern; a total of 10 torpedoes were carried.

E-class submarines had wireless systems with  power ratings; in some submarines, these were later upgraded to  systems by removing a midship torpedo tube. Their maximum design depth was  although in service some reached depths of below . Some submarines contained Fessenden oscillator systems.

Crew
Her complement was three officers and 28 men.

References

 

British E-class submarines of the Royal Navy
Ships built on the River Tyne
1916 ships
World War I submarines of the United Kingdom
Royal Navy ship names